Meisha Pyke (born 12 October 1982) is a former association football player who represented New Zealand at international level.

Pyke made her Football Ferns début in a 1–2 loss to Japan on 2 June 2000, and finished her international career with five caps to her credit.

References

1982 births
Living people
New Zealand women's international footballers
New Zealand women's association footballers
Women's association footballers not categorized by position